Looking Ahead is the debut album by American jazz musician Ken McIntyre, recorded with fellow alto saxophonist Eric Dolphy in 1960 and released on the New Jazz label in January 1961.

Reception

Allmusic awarded the album 4½ stars stating "It was quite fitting that Ken McIntyre had an opportunity to record in a quintet with Eric Dolphy, for his multi-instrumental approach was similar to Dolphy's, although he always had a very different sound... A very interesting date".

Track listing
All compositions by Ken McIntyre except as indicated
 "Lautir" - 4:03
 "Curtsy" - 5:51
 "Geo's Tune" - 7:15
 "They All Laughed" (George Gershwin, Ira Gershwin) - 5:06
 "Head Shakin'" - 10:45
 "Dianna" - 9:05

Personnel 
Ken McIntyre - alto saxophone, flute
Eric Dolphy - alto saxophone, bass clarinet, flute
Walter Bishop Jr. - piano
Sam Jones - bass
Art Taylor - drums

References 

1961 albums
Makanda Ken McIntyre albums
New Jazz Records albums
Albums produced by Esmond Edwards
Albums recorded at Van Gelder Studio